Egmond-pier-Egmond is a men's and women's beach mountainbiking event held annually in Egmond aan Zee, Netherlands. The first edition was in 1998.

Honours

Men's

Women's

References

External links

Mountain biking events
Recurring sporting events established in 1998
1998 establishments in the Netherlands
Mountain biking events in the Netherlands
Sport in Bergen, North Holland